The Fossil Public School, also known as Wheeler County Public School, is a historic Classical Revival style school in Fossil, Oregon, that is listed on the National Register of Historic Places (NRHP).

Built in 1924, it was designed by architects DeYoung and Roald of Portland and served all grades until 1949, when ninth through twelfth were moved to the new Wheeler High School.

It was listed on the NRHP on May 22, 2013; the listing included the school building and also the gymnasium as another contributing building.  It was deemed significant "for the important role it played in the educational development of this rural community since its construction."

The current Fossil Elementary School has about 50 students in kindergarten through eighth grades.

References

See also
Wheeler High School (Fossil, Oregon)

National Register of Historic Places in Wheeler County, Oregon
School buildings completed in 1924
Schools in Wheeler County, Oregon
School buildings on the National Register of Historic Places in Oregon
1924 establishments in Oregon